Radike Samo (born 9 July 1976 in Nadi, Fiji) is a retired Australian rugby union player. He plays lock, flanker, number 8 and can even play on the wing.

Rugby career
Between 2000 and 2006 Samo played 35 games for the ACT Brumbies.

He played with the Fiji Under-19's national team before winning 6 caps for the Wallabies in 2004.

In the summer of 2006, he signed a two-year contract with French giants Stade Français after rejecting an offer from Cardiff Blues. He scored a try on his debut with the Paris team after just 6 minutes (v ASM Clermont Auvergne, 30 August 2006, 45-15) and the winning try in the French Championship final against the same team in Stade de France on 9 June 2007, after scoring against Biarritz Olympique in the semi final, both times coming off the bench.

In April 2010, he returned from Japan to play for the Southern Districts Rebels in the Shute Shield competition, before joining the Queensland Reds on a short-term contract as cover for James Horwill. He started off slowly but after several games he was dubbed "outstanding" by Reds coach Ewen Mckenzie. He continued with the Reds in 2011, playing in the team's Super Rugby final triumph on his 35th birthday. The following day it was announced he had been called up to the Wallabies 40-man squad for the Test against Samoa, and TriNations series against New Zealand and South Africa.

He scored his first test try for the Wallabies during the final Tri-Nations and Bledisloe Cup match against the All Blacks in Brisbane on 27 August 2011. This try was later selected as the IRPA Try of the Year 2011.

At 35 years old, Samo is the oldest player to play for Australia in a Tri-Nations match. He, unusually, played on the wing for the Wallabies 2011 Rugby World Cup match with Russia, in place of the injured Drew Mitchell.

It was announced on 16 January 2015 that he had signed with the Melbourne Rebels. In 2015, he played for Melbourne Rebels in Super Rugby and Queensland Country in National Rugby Championship. In 2016, he played in the Queensland Premier Rugby competition.

In 2017, he played for Brisbane City in National Rugby Championship.

Representative record
 Super 12/14 debut: 2000 v Reds, Canberra
 Test debut: 2004 v Scotland, Melbourne

Achievements 
 Won 2001 & 2004 Super 12 Championship with ACT Brumbies
 Test Rugby Debut: 2004 v Scotland
 2007 French Top 14 Champion with Stade Français
 Won 2011 Super 15 Championship with Queensland Reds
 Recalled into 2011 Wallabies 40-man Tri-nations and Bledisloe Cup squad after a 7-year absence
 Member of Wallabies 2011 Rugby World Cup squad
 Won 3rd place with the Wallabies in the 2011 World Cup.
 IRB try of the year award 2011
 Recalled into the Wallabies 30-man squad for the 2012 Bledisloe Cup and inaugural rugby championship.

References

External links
Queensland Reds profile
Wallabies profile
itsrugby.co.uk profile

1976 births
Australian rugby union players
Australian people of I-Taukei Fijian descent
Australia international rugby union players
ACT Brumbies players
Queensland Reds players
Melbourne Rebels players
Hanazono Kintetsu Liners players
Stade Français players
Rugby union flankers
Rugby union number eights
World Rugby Awards winners
Australian expatriate rugby union players
Expatriate rugby union players in France
Expatriate rugby union players in Japan
Australian expatriate sportspeople in France
Fijian emigrants to Australia
Sportspeople from Nadi
Living people
Queensland Country (NRC team) players
Brisbane City (rugby union) players